Lulu Khadija Hassan is a Kenyan journalist, news anchor, producer, and CEO of Jiffy Pictures. She hosts the Nipashe Wikendi news bulletin on Citizen TV, alongside Rashid Abdalla. The bulletin is broadcast in Swahili and airs on Saturday and Sunday.

Early life 
Lulu was born in Mombasa County and she attended Aga Khan Academy. After completing her studies, Lulu received training in various roles related to the travel industry at Salrene Travel Operations College. She then began working as a radio broadcaster at Radio Salaam in Mombasa and decided to further her education and she studied Communication and Journalism.

Career 
Lulu Hassan began her journalism career as a radio host at Radio Salaam after completing her high school education. In 2008, she was working as a news presenter at the station, reading the news in English. It was during this time that a KTN cameraman informed her of a crisis at the network, as two of their Swahili anchors were going on maternity leave. Hassan decided to take a risk and auditioned for the role, ultimately being hired by KTN Television as a news anchor.

She later moved to Royal Media Services, where she continues to work as an anchor, co-hosting the show Nipashe Wikendi with Rashid Abdalla on Citizen TV.

Lulu Hassan is the CEO and founder of Jiffy Pictures, a film production house she owns with her husband, Rashid Abdalla. Jiffy Pictures has gained recognition for producing programs for local TV stations and on-demand streaming platforms such as MultiChoice's DStv and Showmax. Hassan is also a producer on many of the series produced by Jiffy Pictures, which include Maria, Sultana, Zora, Moyo and Aziza on Citizen TV, Huba on Maisha Magic Bongo, Kovu on Showmax, and Maza on Maisha Magic East. In 2018, Maza was nominated for Best TV Drama and Best Lead Actress at the Kalasha Awards. These series are particularly popular in Kenya and Tanzania, where Swahili is the main language.

Personal life 
Lulu Hassan is married to Rashid Abdalla, a Swahili presenter at Citizen TV in Royal Media Services. The couple married in Mombasa in 2009, having met while working at Radio Salaam.

Accolades 
Lulu was crowned "Mwanamke Wa Shoka" (Woman of Inspiration) in East Africa at the 2022 Mwanamke wa Shoka awards organized by Tanzanian media house EFM and TVE.

Lulu was awarded the Best Movie/Series Producer of the Year in Africa at the 2022 ZIKOMO Awards. The international awards gala was held in Zambia.

Lulu Hassan, through her production company Jiffy Pictures, won the Best Producer Award (TV Drama - Maria) at the 2021 Women in Film Awards ceremony.

References 

Living people
Kenyan journalists
Kenyan women in business
Year of birth missing (living people)